Edward Te Rangihiwinui Tauroa  (29 May 1927 – 11 December 2018), known as Hiwi Tauroa, was a New Zealand rugby union player and coach, school principal, and civil servant of Māori descent.

Early life
Tauroa, who was of Ngāpuhi descent, was born in Okaiawa, near Hāwera in Taranaki in 1927, the son of a Methodist minister. His parents moved frequently, and Tauroa began his school life at Waima in the Hokianga. From there he went to Hawera Technical High School, where he won a scholarship to study at Massey University College.

Teaching
Through tertiary study at both Auckland and Massey Agricultural College, Tauroa graduated in 1952 with a Bachelor of Agricultural Science, before beginning papers for a Diploma in Education. After graduating he taught at various schools throughout the North Island.

Tauroa served as the principal of Wesley College from 1968, before becoming the principal of Tuakau College in 1974, a post he held until 1979. He was the first Māori to be appointed head of a secondary school.

Rugby union
Tauroa was originally best known for his rugby union career, and played for New Zealand Māori from 1951 to 1954. Hiwi, selected while at Massey Agricultural College, toured Australia with the NZ Universities Team in 1951 coached by Ron Bush, an uncle of renown photographer Peter Bush. Their tour was a major success with two wins against an Australian Universities side as well as winning their six minor fixtures. He continued his interest in rugby in later life, becoming coach of the Counties Rugby Union in the 1970s, and leading them to the National Provincial Championship title in 1979.

Public and political life
In 1979, Tauroa was appointed New Zealand's Race Relations Conciliator. In this capacity, he promoted the concept of educating Pākehā in traditional Māori customs and culture, instigating marae courses for state and private corporations and encouraging large businesses to adopt a more multicultural mindset. During his time as Race Relations Conciliator, New Zealand faced major civil unrest caused by the 1981 Springbok Tour. Tauroa was heavily involved in New Zealand's anti-apartheid campaign during this time. Tauroa was also heavily involved in fostering links between Māori and China, establishing with Rewi Alley the New Zealand–China Māori Friendship Association in 1984.

Tauroa retired in 1985, moving to the small Northland town of Kaeo. Here he was appointed the chair of Te Rūnanga o Whaingaroa, a position which he held until 2000. In 1986, he put himself forward for the National Party nomination in the Auckland electorate of Eden. Up against three other nominees (David Phillips, Jock Parbhu and Trevor Rogers) he was successful. At the  general election he was unsuccessful in winning the seat.

Tauroa also served as chairman of Te Māngai Pāho and the New Zealand Sports Foundation, and served on the board of many educational and Māori organisations, among them the United Nations Indigenous Peoples Trust. He also authored several books on the Treaty of Waitangi and Māori culture, most notably Te Marae: A guide to customs and protocol (1986; Reed Methuen), which was co-written with his wife Patricia. Tauroa was appointed a Companion of the Order of St Michael and St George, for public services, in the 1994 New Year Honours.

Death
Tauroa died on 11 December 2018 at his home in Waipuna, Whangaroa, aged 91. He was survived by Patricia (née Wilson), his wife of 60 years, and their six children, along with numerous grandchildren and great-grandchildren.

References

External links
HIWI TAUROA at ESPN.uk
Interview with Hiwi Tauroa at National Library

1927 births
2018 deaths
Companions of the New Zealand Order of Merit
Māori All Blacks players
Massey University alumni
New Zealand Companions of the Order of St Michael and St George
New Zealand justices of the peace
New Zealand National Party politicians
New Zealand non-fiction writers
New Zealand public servants
New Zealand rugby union coaches
New Zealand schoolteachers
Ngāpuhi people
People educated at Hawera High School
People from Hāwera
People from the Northland Region
Rugby union players from Hāwera
University of Auckland alumni
Unsuccessful candidates in the 1987 New Zealand general election